The Fokker Scourge (Fokker Scare) occurred during the First World War from July 1915 to early 1916.

The Fokker was the first service aircraft to be fitted with a machine gun synchronised to fire through the arc of the propeller without striking the blades. The tactical advantage of aiming the gun by aiming the aircraft and the surprise of its introduction were factors in its success.

This period of German air superiority ended with the arrival in numbers of the French Nieuport 11 and British Airco DH.2 fighters, which were capable of challenging the Fokkers, although the last Fokkers were not finally replaced until August–September 1916.

The term "Fokker Scourge" was coined by the British press in mid-1916, after the  had been outclassed by the new Allied types. Use of the term coincided with a political campaign to end a perceived dominance of the Royal Aircraft Factory in the supply of aircraft to the Royal Flying Corps, a campaign that was begun by the pioneering aviation journalist C. G. Grey and Noel Pemberton Billing M.P., founder of Pemberton-Billing Ltd (Supermarine from 1916) and a great enthusiast for aerial warfare.

Background

Early air warfare

As aerial warfare developed, the Allies gained a lead over the Germans by introducing machine-gun armed types such as the Vickers F.B.5 Gunbus fighter and the Morane-Saulnier L. By early 1915, the German  (OHL, Supreme Army Command) had ordered the development of machine-gun-armed aircraft to counter those of the Allies.

On 18 April 1915, the Morane-Saulnier L of Roland Garros was captured, after he was forced to land behind the German lines. From 1April, Garros had destroyed three German aircraft in the Morane, which carried a machine-gun firing through the propeller arc. Saulnier had failed to develop a synchroniser and with Garros, as an interim solution, fitted metal wedges to the propeller; bullets that hit the blades were deflected by them. Garros burned his aircraft but this failed to conceal the nature of the device and the significance of the deflector blades. The German authorities requested several aircraft manufacturers, including that of Anthony Fokker, to produce a copy.

Synchronisation gear

Impulses from a cam driven by the engine controlled the timing of the machine-gun for its fire to be limited to the intervals between the propeller blades' travel past the barrel. In a postwar biography, Fokker claimed that he produced the gear in 48hours but it was probably designed by Heinrich Lübbe, a  engineer. Among several pre-war patents for similar devices was that of Franz Schneider, a Swiss engineer who had worked for Nieuport and the German LVG company.

The device was fitted to the most suitable Fokker type, the Fokker M.5K (military type name "Fokker A.III"), of which A.16/15, assigned to Otto Parschau, became the prototype of the Fokker Eindecker series of fighter designs. Fokker demonstrated A.16/15 to German fighter pilots, including Kurt Wintgens, Oswald Boelcke and Max Immelmann in May and June 1915. The Fokker, with its typical  controls, an over-sensitive balanced elevator and dubious lateral control, was difficult to fly; Parschau, who was experienced on FokkerA types, converted pilots to the new fighter. The early  were attached to FFAs, in ones and twos, to protect reconnaissance machines from Allied machine-gun-armed aircraft.

Operational service

Service début

Fokker  E.5/15, the last of the pre-production series, is believed to have been first flown in action by Kurt Wintgens of FFA6. On 1and 4July 1915, he reported combats with French Morane-SaulnierL (Parasols), well over the French lines. The claims were not confirmed but research has shown that the first claim matches French records of a Morane forced down on 1July near Lunéville, with a wounded crew and a damaged engine, followed three days later by another. By 15July, Wintgens had moved to FFA48 and scored his first confirmed victory, another MoraneL. Parschau had received the new E.1/15 (Fokker factory serial 191), the initial example of the five Fokker M.5K/MG service test examples for the  line of aircraft, when the A.16/15 (green machine), he had flown since the beginning of the war, was returned to the Fokker Flugzeugbau factory in Schwerin–Gorries for development.

By the end of July 1915, about fifteen  were operational with various units, including the five M.5K/MGs and about ten early production E.I airframes. The pilots flew the new aircraft as a sideline, when not flying normal operations in two-seater reconnaissance aircraft. Boelcke, in FFA62, scored his first victory in an Albatros C.I on 4July. M.5K/MG prototype airframe E.3/15, the first  delivered to FFA62, was armed with a Parabellum MG14 gun, synchronised by the unreliable first version of the Fokker gear. At first, E.3/15 was jointly allocated to him and Immelmann when their "official" duties permitted, allowing them to master the type's difficult handling characteristics and to practice shooting at ground targets. Immelmann was soon allocated a very early production Fokker E.I, E.13/15, one of the first armed with the lMG 08 (a lightened version of the MG08 Spandau) machine-gun, using the more reliable production version of the Fokker gear.

The Scourge begins

The Fokker Scourge is usually considered by the British to have begun on 1August, when B.E.2cs of 2 Squadron Royal Flying Corps (RFC) bombed the base of FFA62 at  waking the German pilots, including Boelcke (most likely, still with E 3/15) and Immelmann (flying E 13/15), who were quickly into the air after the raiders. Boelcke suffered a jammed gun but Immelmann caught up with a B.E.2c and shot it down. This aircraft was flown as a bomber, without an observer or Lewis gun, the pilot armed only with an automatic pistol. After about ten minutes of manoeuvring (giving the lie to exaggerated accounts of the stability of B.E.2 aircraft) Immelmann had fired 450rounds, which riddled the B.E. and wounded the pilot in the arm. By late October, towards the end of the Battle of Loos, more Fokkers (including the similar Pfalz E-type fighters, which were also called Fokkers by Allied airmen) were encountered by RFC pilots and by December, forty Fokkers were in service.

In the new fighters, pilots could make long, steep dives, aiming the fixed, synchronised machine-gun by aiming the aircraft. The machine gun was belt-fed, unlike the drum-fed Lewis guns of their opponents, who had to change drums when in action. The Fokker pilots took to flying high and diving on their quarry, usually out of the sun, firing a long burst and continuing the dive until well out of range. If the British aircraft had not been shot down, the German pilot could climb again and repeat the process. Immelmann invented the Immelmann turn, a zoom after the dive, followed by a roll when vertical to face the opposite way, after which he could turn to attack again.

The mystique acquired by the Fokker was greater than its material effect and in October, RFC HQ expressed concern at the willingness of pilots to avoid combat. RFC losses were exacerbated by the increase in  the number of aircraft at the front, from 85 to 161 between March and September, the hard winter of 1915–1916 and some aggressive flying by the new German "C" type two-seaters. Boelcke and Immelmann continued to score, as did Hans Joachim Buddecke, Ernst von Althaus and Rudolph Berthold from FFA23 and Kurt vonCrailshein of FFA53. The "official" list of claims by Fokker pilots for the second half of 1915 was no more than 28, many of them over French aircraft. Thirteen aeroplanes had been shot down by Immelmann or Boelcke and the rest by seven other Fokker pilots. January 1916 brought thirteen claims, most of them against the French, followed by twenty more in February, the last month of the "scourge" proper. Most of the victories were scored by aces rather than the newer pilots flying the greater number of Fokkers. Allied casualties had been light by later standards but the loss of air superiority to the Germans, flying a new and supposedly invincible aircraft, caused dismay among the Allied commanders and lowered the morale of Allied airmen. In his memoir Sagittarius Rising (1936), Cecil Lewis wrote,

On 14 January, RFC HQ issued orders that until better aircraft arrived, long and short-range reconnaissance aircraft must have three escorts flying in close formation. If contact with the escorts was lost, the reconnaissance must be cancelled, as would photographic reconnaissance to any great distance beyond the front line. Sending the B.E.2c into action without an observer armed with a Lewis gun also became less prevalent. The new tactic of concentrating aircraft in time and space had the effect of reducing the number of reconnaissance sorties the RFC could fly.

New defensive formations were devised; a II Wing RFC method was for the reconnaissance aircraft to lead, escorted on each side  higher, with another escort  behind and above. West of Thourout, two Fokkers arrived and attacked at once, one diving on the reconnaissance machine and the other on an escort. Six more German aircraft appeared over Cortemarck (Kortemark) and formed a procession of fourteen aeroplanes stalking the British formation. None of the German pilots attacked and all the British aircraft returned, only to meet two German aircraft coming back from a bombing raid, which opened fire and mortally wounded the pilot of one of the escorts. The British ascribed their immunity to attack during the 55-minute flight to the rigid formation which the two Fokkers were unable to disrupt. On 7 February, a 12 Squadron B.E.2c., was to be escorted by three B.E.2cs, two F.E.2s and a Bristol Scout from 12 Squadron and two more F.Es. and four R.E. aeroplanes from 21 Squadron. The flight was cancelled due to bad weather but twelve escorts for one reconnaissance aircraft demonstrated the effect of the Fokkers in reducing the efficiency of RFC operations.

British and French reconnaissance flights to get aerial photographs for intelligence and ranging data for their artillery had become riskier, in spite of German fighters being forbidden to fly over Allied lines (to keep the synchronisation gear secret). This policy, for various reasons, prevailed for most of the war; the rarity of German fighters appearing behind the Allied lines limited the degree of air superiority they were able to attain.

End of the Scourge

The scourge waned during the Battle of Verdun (21February20December 1916). The Germans tried to impose an air barrage which concealed much of the German preparation for the offensive from French aerial reconnaissance. During March and April increasing numbers of the new French Nieuport 11 fighters were sent to Verdun.

British F.E.2b pusher aircraft had been arriving in France from late 1915 and in the New Year began to replace the older F.B.5s. The pilot and observer had a good view forwards from their cockpits and the observer could also fire backwards over the tail. 20 Squadron, the first squadron equipped with the F.E., arrived in France on 23January 1916, for long-range reconnaissance and escort flying. The new aircraft lacked the speed to pursue the Fokkers and had limited manoeuvrability but the F.E.s became formidable opponents, particularly when flying in formation.

The Airco DH.2, a single-seat fighter, began to arrive at the front in February 1916. On 8 February, 24 Squadron (Major Lanoe Hawker) arrived with D.H.2s and began patrols north of the Somme; another six D.H.2 squadrons followed. On 25 April, two of the D.H. pilots were attacked and found that they could out-manoeuvre the Fokkers; a few days later, without opening fire, a D.H. pilot caused a Fokker to crash onto a roof at Bapaume. The Nieuports proved even more effective when the first Nieuport 16s in British service were issued to 1 and 11 Squadrons in April.

By March 1916, despite frequent encounters with Fokkers and the success of  aces, the scourge was almost over. The bogey of the Fokker  as a fighter was finally laid in April, when an E.III landed by mistake at a British aerodrome. The captured aircraft was found not to have the superior performance it had been credited with. The first British aircraft with a synchronisation gear was a Bristol Scout, which arrived on 25 March 1916 and on 24 May the first Sopwith 1½ Strutter aircraft were flown to France by a flight of 70 Squadron.

End of the 

The effect of the new Allied types, especially the Nieuport, was of considerable concern to the Fokker pilots; some even took to flying captured examples.  was sufficiently desperate to order German firms to build Nieuport copies, of which the Euler D.I and the Siemens-Schuckert D.I were built in small numbers. New D type single-seat, biplane fighters, particularly the Fokker D.II and Halberstadt D.II, had been under test since late 1915 and the replacement of the monoplanes with these types began by mid-1916.

In February 1916,  Friedrich Stempel began to assemble  (KEK, single-seat battle units). In late May, German air activity on the British front decreased markedly, while the commander of the new ,  (Colonel) Hermann von der Lieth-Thomsen, reorganised the German air service. The fighters of the KEK were concentrated into fighter squadrons the first of which, Jagdstaffel 2 went into action on the Somme on 17 September.

Aftermath

Analysis

Among British politicians and journalists who grossly exaggerated the material effects of the "Scourge" were the eminent pioneering aviation journalist C.G. Grey, founder of The Aeroplane, one of the first aviation magazines and Noel Pemberton Billing, a Royal Naval Air Service (RNAS) pilot, notably unsuccessful aircraft designer and manufacturer and a Member of Parliament from March 1916. Their supposed object was the replacement of the B.E.2c with better aircraft but it took the form of an attack on the RFC command and the Royal Aircraft Factory. C.G. Grey had orchestrated a campaign against the Royal Aircraft Factory in the pages of The Aeroplane, going back to its period as the Balloon Factory, well before it had produced any heavier-than-air aircraft.

Before the unsuitability of the B.E.2c for aerial combat was exposed by the first Fokker aces, criticism was not primarily aimed at the technical quality of Royal Aircraft Factory aircraft but because a government body was competing with private industry. When the news of the Fokker monoplane fighters reached him in late 1915, Grey was quick to blame the problem on orders for equipment that the latest developments had rendered obsolete. Grey did not suggest alternative aircraft, even supposing that the rapid development of aviation technology during the war could have been foreseen. Pemberton Billing also blamed the initially poor performance of British aircraft manufacturers on what he saw as the favouritism shown by the RFC, an arm of the British Army, towards the Royal Aircraft Factory, which, while nominally civilian, was also part of the army. Pemberton Billing claimed that,

Even among writers who recognised the hysteria of this version of events, this picture of the Fokker Scourge gained considerable currency during the war and afterwards. In 1996 Peter Grosz wrote,

Subsequent operations

The period of Allied air superiority that followed the Fokker Scourge was brief; by mid-September 1916, the first twin-Spandau armed Albatros D.I fighters were coming into service. When this tactic became untenable, development of new aircraft began, which led to the Fokker D.VII. The new aircraft created another Fokker Scourge in the summer of 1918 and as a condition of the Armistice, Germany was required to surrender all of its Fokker D.VIIs to the Allies.

References

Citations

Bibliography

 Angelucci, E., ed. The Rand McNally Encyclopedia of Military Aircraft. New York: The Military Press, 1983. .
 Bruce, J. M. Morane Saulnier Type L. Berkhamstead, UK: Albatros Productions, 1989. .
 Bruce, J. M. War Planes of the First World War. London: MacDonald, 1968. .
 Cheesman, E. F. (ed.) Fighter Aircraft of the 1914–1918 War. Letchworth, UK: Harleyford, 1960. OCLC 771602378.
 Franks, Norman. Sharks among Minnows: Germany's First Fighter Pilots and the Fokker Eindecker Period, July 1915 to September 1916. London: Grub Street, 2001. .
 Gray, Peter and Owen Thetford. German Aircraft of the First World War. London: Putman, 1990, First edition 1962. .
 Grosz, P. M. Fokker E.III. Berkhamstead, UK: Albatros Productions, 1989. .
 Grosz, P. M. Halberstadt Fighters. Berkhamstead, UK: Albatros Productions, 1996. .
 
 Hare, Paul R. The Royal Aircraft Factory. London: Putnam, 1990. .
 Herris, Jack and Bob Pearson. Aircraft of World War I: 1914–1918. London: Amber, 2010. .
 Hoeppner, E. W. von Deutschlands Krieg in der Luft: ein Rückblick auf die Entwicklung und die Leistungen unserer Heeres-Luftstreitkräfte im Weltkriege (in German) translation Germany's War in the Air. Battery Press, 1994. original publication: Leipzig: 1921, K. F. Koehle. .
 Immelmann, Franz (appendix by Norman Franks). Immelmann: The Eagle of Lille. Drexel Hill, UK: Casemate, 2009 (originally published in Germany, 1934). .
 Jones, H. A. The War in the Air, Being the Story of the Part Played in the Great War by the Royal Air Force, (volume II). original publication, London: Clarendon Press 1928. London: Imperial War Museum and N & M Press facs. edition, 2002. , access date 12 April 2015 .
 Lewis, Cecil. Sagittarius Rising. London: Penguin, 1977 (first published 1936). .
 Kennett, Lee The First Air War: 1914–1918 New York, Simon & Schuster, 1991.  .
 Robertson, Linda R. The Dream of Civilized Warfare: World War I Flying Aces and the American Imagination Minneapolis, University of Minnesota Press, 2003. .
 Terraine, John. White Heat: The New Warfare 1914–1918. London: Book Club Associates, 1982. .
 Weyl, A. J., Fokker: The Creative Years. London: Putnam, 1965.
 Wyngarden, Greg van. Early German Aces of World War I. Botley, UK: Osprey Publishing, 2006. .
 Woodman, Harry. Early Aircraft Armament: The Aeroplane and the Gun up to 1918. London: Arms and Armour Press, 1989. .
 Wise, S. F. Canadian Airmen and the First World War. The Official History of the Royal Canadian Air Force vol. I. (repr. ed.). Toronto: University of Toronto Press,1981 [1980]. .

Further reading

External links
 The War in the Air - Fighters: The Fokker Scourge
 The Fokker scourge 
 Caricature satirising exaggerated view of Fokker Scourge
 The Aeroplane, volume 10, January–March 1916
 An Aviator's Field Book, being the field reports of Oswald Bölcke, from 1 August 1914 – 28 October 1916

Aviation in World War I
Aerial operations and battles of World War I